= Das Modul (German radio station) =

- Germany
- Broadcast area: Bavaria

Programming
- Language: German

Ownership
- Operator: Bayerischer Rundfunk (BR)

History
- First air date: 1 January 2003
- Last air date: 4 May 2008

Das Modul was a German, public radio station owned and operated by the Bayerischer Rundfunk (BR).
